Frida Margareta Nevalainen (born 27 January 1987 in Umeå, Sweden) is an ice hockey player. Nevalainen is a defenceman for the Sweden women's national ice hockey team. She won a silver medal at the 2006 Winter Olympics. (In Swedish)

Her twin brother Patrik also played professional ice hockey, playing in the SM-liiga with Lukko and the Elitserien for Timrå IK.

Nevalainen was the second woman of all time to participate in the TV-pucken tournament, and the first to do so representing the province of Västerbotten.

She has also played for Tornado Moscow Region, a Russian team. Originally representing IF Björklöven she later transferred to Modo Hockey in the Riksserien (Sweden league elite). She played for the University of Windsor in the 2007–08 season.

References

1987 births
Ice hockey players at the 2006 Winter Olympics
Ice hockey players at the 2010 Winter Olympics
Living people
Medalists at the 2006 Winter Olympics
Olympic ice hockey players of Sweden
Olympic medalists in ice hockey
Olympic silver medalists for Sweden
Sportspeople from Umeå
Swedish people of Finnish descent
Swedish women's ice hockey defencemen
Swedish twins
Twin sportspeople